PZ Telescopii, also known as HD 174429 or simply PZ Tel, is a young star in the constellation Telescopium. Based on parallax measurements, it is located at a distance of 154 light years from the Sun. The star is drifting closer with a radial velocity of −4 km/s. It is one of the closest and hence brightest pre-main-sequence stars to Earth.

PZ Telescopii has an effective surface temperature of around 5,338 K (the Sun has an approximate surface temperature of 5,778 K), a mass around 1.13 times, and diameter 1.23 times that of the Sun. It is radiating about the same luminosity as the Sun. PZ Telescopii was originally considered to be a member of the Beta Pictoris moving group; however in a 2012 paper, James Jenkins of Universidad de Chile and colleagues used three methods to calculate its age and came up with a figure of around 24 million years—significantly older than the 12 million years of the association.

This star has an orbiting debris disk calculated to span from a radius of 35 to 165 astronomical units (AU), as well as a substellar companion with 36 times the mass of Jupiter orbiting at a distance of 16 AU, discovered in 2008. The companion, currently known as PZ Tel B, is thought to be a brown dwarf; however it is possible (though very unlikely) that it is an extremely large Jupiter-like planet, in which case it would be PZ Tel b, and the first such planet to be directly imaged. Preliminary orbital elements give a best fit orbital period of 622.2 years with an eccentricity of 0.755.

References

External links

G-type subgiants
Circumstellar disks
BY Draconis variables
Brown dwarfs
Telescopium (constellation)
Durchmusterung objects
174429
092680
Telescopii, PZ